Peeler Bluff is a prominent rock bluff along the middle of the west coast of McNamara Island. The island lies within the northern edge of Abbot Ice Shelf, but Peeler Bluff is a conspicuous navigation mark from seaward. This area was explored by personnel aboard the USS Glacier and Staten Island in February 1961. Named by Advisory Committee on Antarctic Names (US-ACAN) for Lieutenant Commander James C. Peeler, U.S. Navy, who camped here, February 7–9, 1961, and obtained position data for the bluff and other points in the vicinity.

Cliffs of Ellsworth Land